In mathematics, hypergeometric identities are equalities involving sums over hypergeometric terms, i.e. the coefficients occurring in hypergeometric series. These identities occur frequently in solutions to combinatorial problems, and also in the analysis of algorithms. 

These identities were traditionally found 'by hand'. There exist now several algorithms which can find and prove all hypergeometric identities.

Examples

Definition 
There are two definitions of hypergeometric terms, both used in different cases as explained below. See also hypergeometric series.

A term tk is a hypergeometric term if
 

is a rational function in k.

A term F(n,k) is a hypergeometric term if
 

is a rational function in k.

There exist two types of sums over hypergeometric terms, the definite and indefinite sums. A definite sum is of the form
 

The indefinite sum is of the form

Proofs 
Although in the past one has found proofs of certain identities there exist several algorithms to find and prove identities. These algorithms first find a simple expression for a sum over hypergeometric terms and then provide a certificate which anyone could use to easily check and prove the correctness of the identity.

For each of the hypergeometric sum types there exist one or more methods to find a simple expression. These methods also provide a certificate to easily check the proof of an identity:
 Definite sums: Sister Celine's Method, Zeilberger's algorithm
 Indefinite sums: Gosper's algorithm

A book named A = B has been written by Marko Petkovšek, Herbert Wilf and Doron Zeilberger describing the three main approaches described above.

See also
 Table of Newtonian series

External links 
 The book "A = B", this book is freely downloadable from the internet.
 Special-functions examples at exampleproblems.com

Factorial and binomial topics
Hypergeometric functions
Mathematical identities
fr:Identités hypergéométriques